The geology of the Grand Canyon area includes one of the most complete and studied sequences of rock on Earth. The nearly 40 major sedimentary rock layers exposed in the Grand Canyon and in the Grand Canyon National Park area range in age from about 200 million to nearly 2 billion years old. Most were deposited in warm, shallow seas and near ancient, long-gone sea shores in western North America. Both marine and terrestrial sediments are represented, including lithified sand dunes from an extinct desert. There are at least 14 known unconformities in the geologic record found in the Grand Canyon.

Uplift of the region started about 75 million years ago during the Laramide orogeny; a mountain-building event that is largely responsible for creating the Rocky Mountains to the east. In total, the Colorado Plateau was uplifted an estimated . The adjacent Basin and Range Province to the west started to form about 18 million years ago as the result of crustal stretching. A drainage system that flowed through what is today the eastern Grand Canyon emptied into the now lower Basin and Range province. Opening of the Gulf of California around 6 million years ago enabled a large river to cut its way northeast from the gulf. The new river captured the older drainage to form the ancestral Colorado River, which in turn started to form the Grand Canyon.

Wetter climates brought upon by ice ages starting 2 million years ago greatly increased excavation of the Grand Canyon, which was nearly as deep as it is now, 1.2 million years ago. Volcanic activity deposited lava over the area 1.8 million to 500,000 years ago. The end of the last ice age and subsequent human activity has greatly reduced the ability of the Colorado River to excavate the canyon. Dams in particular have upset patterns of sediment transport and deposition. Controlled floods from Glen Canyon Dam upstream have been conducted to see if they have a restorative effect. Earthquakes and mass wasting erosive events still affect the region.

Deposition of sediments

Vishnu Basement Rocks 

At about 2.5 and 1.8 billion years ago in Precambrian time, sand, mud, silt, and ash were laid down in a marine basin adjacent to an orogenic belt. From 1.8 to 1.6 billion years ago at least two island arcs collided with the proto-North American continent. This process of plate tectonics compressed and grafted the marine sediments in the basin onto the mainland and uplifted them out of the sea. Later, these rocks were buried  under the surface and pressure-cooked into metamorphic rock. The resulting Granite Gorge Metamorphic Suite, which is part of the Vishnu Basement Rocks, consists of the metasedimentary Vishnu Schist and the metavolcanic Brahma and Rama Schists that were formed 1.75 billion to 1.73 billion years ago. This is the resistant rock now exposed at the bottom of the canyon in the Inner Gorge.

As the volcanic islands collided with the mainland around 1.7 billion years ago, blobs of magma rose from the subduction zone and intruded the Granite Gorge Metamorphic Suite. These plutons slowly cooled to form the Zoroaster Granite; part of which would later be metamorphosed into gneiss. This rock unit can be seen as light-colored bands in the darker garnet-studded Vishnu Schist (see 1b in figure 1). The intrusion of the granite occurred in three phases: two during the initial Vishnu metamorphism period, and a third around 1.4 billion years ago. The third phase was accompanied by large-scale faulting, particularly along north–south faults, leading to a partial rifting of the continent. The collision expanded the continent from the Wyoming–Colorado border into Mexico and almost doubled the crust's thickness in the Grand Canyon region.

Subsequent erosion lasting 300 million years stripped much of the exposed sediments and the mountains away. This reduced the very high mountains to small hills a few tens to hundreds of feet (tens of meters) high. Geologist John Wesley Powell called this major gap in the geologic record, which is also seen in other parts of the world, the Great Unconformity. Other sediments may have been added but, if they ever existed, were completely removed by erosion. Such gaps in the geologic record are called unconformities by geologists. The Great Unconformity is one of the best examples of an exposed nonconformity, which is a type of unconformity that has bedded rock units above igneous or metamorphic rocks.

Grand Canyon Supergroup 

In late Precambrian time, extension from a large tectonic plate or smaller plates moving away from Laurentia thinned its continental crust, forming large rift basins that would ultimately fail to split the continent. Eventually, this sunken region of Laurentia was flooded with a shallow seaway that extended from at least present-day Lake Superior to Glacier National Park in Montana to the Grand Canyon and the Uinta Mountains. The resulting Grand Canyon Supergroup of sedimentary units is composed of nine varied geologic formations that were laid down from 1.2 billion and 740 million years ago in this sea. Good exposures of the supergroup can be seen in eastern Grand Canyon in the Inner Gorge and from Desert View, Lipan Point and Moran point.

The oldest section of the supergroup is the Unkar Group. It accumulated in a variety of fluvial, deltaic, tidal, nearshore marine, and offshore marine environments. The first formation to be laid down in the Unkar Group was the Bass Formation. Fluvial gravels initially accumulated in shallow river valleys. They later lithified into a basal conglomerate that is known as the Hotauta Member of the Bass Formation. The Bass Formation was deposited in a shallow sea near the coast as a mix of limestone, sandstone, and shale. Diagenesis later altered the bulk of the limestone into dolomite. Averaging 1250 million years old, this is the oldest layer exposed in the Grand Canyon that contains fossils—stromatolites. This formation indicates a short-lived regression (retreat) of the seashore in the area that left mud flats. Today it is very bright orange-red and gives the Red Canyon its name. Shinumo Quartzite is a resistant marine sedimentary quartzite that was eroded to form monadnocks that later became islands in Cambrian time. Those islands withstood wave action long enough to become re-buried by other sediments in the Cambrian Period. Ripple marks and other features indicate it was close to the shore. Outcrops of this red to orange formation can be seen in the eastern parts of the canyon. Fossils of stromatolites and algae are found in this layer. At 1070 ± 70 million years old, the Cardenas Basalt is the youngest formation in the Unkar Group.

Nankoweap Formation is around 1050 million years old and is not part of a group. This rock unit is made of coarse-grained sandstone, and was deposited in a shallow sea on top of the eroded surface of the Cardenas Basalt. The Nankoweap is only exposed in the eastern part of the canyon. A gap in the geologic record, an unconformity, follows the Nankoweap.

All formations in the Chuar Group were deposited in coastal and shallow sea environments about 1000 to 700 million years ago. The Galeros Formation is a mainly greenish formation composed of interbedded sandstone, limestone, and shale. Fossilized stromatolites are found in the Galeros. The Kwagunt Formation consists of black shale and red to purple mudstone with some limestone. Isolated pockets of reddish sandstone are also found around Carbon Butte. Stromatolites are found in this layer. The Sixtymile Formation is made of tan-colored sandstone with some small sections of shale.

About 800 million years ago the supergroup was tilted 15° and block faulted in the Grand Canyon Orogeny. Some of the block units moved down and others moved up while fault movement created north–south-trending fault-block mountain ranges. About 100 million years of erosion took place that washed most of the Chuar Group away along with part of the Unkar Group (exposing the Shinumo Quartzite as previously explained). The mountain ranges were reduced to hills, and in some places, the whole  of the supergroup were removed entirely, exposing the basement rocks below. Any rocks that were deposited on top of the Grand Canyon Supergroup in the Precambrian were completely removed. This created a major unconformity that represents 460 million years of lost geologic history in the area.

Tonto Group 

During the Paleozoic era, the western part of what would become North America was near the equator and on a passive margin. The Cambrian Explosion of life took place over about 15 million years in this part of the world. Climate was warm and invertebrates, such as the trilobites, were abundant. An ocean started to return to the Grand Canyon area from the west about 550 million years ago. As its shoreline moved east, the ocean began to concurrently deposit the three formations of the Tonto Group.

Tapeats Sandstone averages 525 million years old and is made of medium- to coarse-grained sand and conglomerate that was deposited on an ancient shore (see 3a in figure 1). Ripple marks are common in the upper members of this dark brown thin-bedded layer. Fossils and imprint trails of trilobites and brachiopods have also been found in the Tapeats. Bright Angel Shale averages 515 million years old and is made of mudstone-derived shale that is interbedded with small sections of sandstone and shaly limestone with a few thin beds of dolomite. It was mostly deposited as mud just offshore and contains brachiopod, trilobite, and worm fossils (see 3b in figure 1). The color of this formation is mostly various shades of green with some brownish-tan to gray parts. Glauconite is responsible for the green coloration of the Bright Angel. Muav Limestone averages 505 million years old and is made of gray, thin-bedded limestone that was deposited farther offshore from calcium carbonate precipitates (see 3c in figure 1). The western part of the canyon has a much thicker sequence of Muav than the eastern part.

These three formations were laid down over a period of 30 million years from early-to-middle Cambrian time. Trilobites followed by brachiopods are the most commonly reported fossils in this group but well-preserved fossils are relatively rare. We know that the shoreline was transgressing (advancing onto land) because finer grade material was deposited on top of coarser-grained sediment. Today, the Tonto Group makes up the Tonto Platform seen above and following the Colorado River; the Tapeats Sandstone and Muav Limestone form the platform's cliffs and the Bright Angel Shale forms its slopes. Unlike the Proterozoic units below it, the Tonto Group's beds basically lie in their original horizontal position. The Bright Angel Shale in the group forms an aquiclude (barrier to groundwater seeping down), and thus collects and directs water through the overlying Muav Limestone to feed springs in the Inner Gorge.

Temple Butte, Redwall, and Surprise Canyon 
The next two periods of geologic history, the Ordovician and the Silurian, are missing from the Grand Canyon sequence. Geologists do not know if sediments were deposited in these periods and were later removed by erosion or if they were never deposited in the first place. Either way, this break in the geologic history of the area spans about 65 million years. A type of unconformity called a disconformity was formed. Disconformities show erosional features such as valleys, hills and cliffs that are later covered by younger sediments.

Geologists do know that deep channels were carved on the top of the Muav Limestone during this time. Streams were the likely cause, but marine scour may be to blame. Either way, these depressions were filled with freshwater limestone about 385 million years ago in the Middle Devonian in a formation that geologists call the Temple Butte Formation (see 4a in figure 1). Marble Canyon in the eastern part of the park displays these filled purplish-colored channels well. Temple Butte Formation is a cliff-former in the western part of the park where it is gray to cream-colored dolomite. Fossils of animals with backbones are found in this formation; bony plates from freshwater fish in the eastern part and numerous marine fish fossils in the western part. An unconformity representing 40 to 50 million years of lost geologic history marks the top of this formation.

Redwall is composed of thick-bedded, dark brown to bluish gray limestone and dolomite with white chert nodules mixed in. It was laid down in a retreating shallow tropical sea near the equator during 40 million years of the early-to-middle Mississippian. Many fossilized crinoids, brachiopods, bryozoans, horn corals, nautiloids, and sponges, along with other marine organisms such as large and complex trilobites have been found in the Redwall. In late Mississippian time, the Grand Canyon region was slowly uplifted and the Redwall was partly eroded away. A Karst topography consisting of caves, sinkholes, and subterranean river channels resulted but were later filled with more limestone. The exposed surface of Redwall gets its characteristic color from rainwater dripping from the iron-rich redbeds of the Supai and Hermit shale that lie above.

Surprise Canyon Formation is a sedimentary layer of purplish-red shale that was laid down in discontinuous beds of sand and lime above the Redwall (see 4c in figure 1). It was created in very late Mississippian and possibly in very earliest Pennsylvanian time as the land subsided and tidal estuaries filled river valleys with sediment. Surprise Canyon was unknown to science until 1973 and can be reached only by helicopter. Fossil logs, other plant material and marine shells are found in this formation. An unconformity marks the top of the Surprise Canyon Formation and in most places this unconformity has entirely removed the Surprise Canyon and exposed the underlying Redwall.

Supai Group 

An unconformity of 15 to 20 million years separates the Supai Group from the previously deposited Redwall Formation. Supai Group was deposited in late Mississippian, through the Pennsylvanian and into the Early Permian time, some 320 million to 270 million years ago. Both marine and non-marine deposits of mud, silt, sand and calcareous sediments were laid down on a broad coastal plain similar to the Texas Gulf Coast of today. Around this time, the Ancestral Rocky Mountains rose in Colorado and New Mexico and streams brought eroded sediment from them to the Grand Canyon area.

Supai Group formations in the western part of the canyon contain limestone, indicative of a warm, shallow sea, while the eastern part was probably a muddy river delta. This formation consists of red siltstones and shale capped by tan-colored sandstone beds that together reach a thickness of 600 to 700 ft (around 200 m). Shale in the early Permian formations in this group were oxidized to a bright red color. Fossils of amphibian footprints, reptiles, and plentiful plant material are found in the eastern part and increasing numbers of marine fossils are found in the western part.

An unconformity marks the top of the Supai Group.

Hermit, Coconino, Toroweap, and Kaibab 
Like the Supai Group below it, the Permian-aged Hermit Formation was probably deposited on a broad coastal plain (see 6a in figure 1). The alternating thin-bedded iron oxide, mud and silt were deposited via freshwater streams in a semiarid environment around 280 million years ago. Fossils of winged insects, cone-bearing plants, and ferns are found in this formation as well as tracks of vertebrate animals. Slope development will periodically undermine the formations above and car- to house-sized blocks of that rock will cascade down onto the Tonto Platform. An unconformity marks the top of this formation .

Coconino Sandstone formed about 275 million years ago as the area dried out and sand dunes made of quartz sand invaded a growing desert (see 6b in figure 1). Some Coconino fills deep mudcracks in the underlying Hermit Shale and the desert that created the Coconino lasted for 5 to 10 million years. Cross bedding patterns of the frosted, fine-grained, well-sorted and rounded quartz grains seen in its cliffs is compatible with but does not substantiate conclusively an eolian environment. Also fossilized are tracks from lizard-like creatures and what look like tracks from millipedes and scorpions. An unconformity marks the top of this formation.

Next in the geologic column is the -thick Toroweap Formation (see 6c in figure 1). It consists of red and yellow sandstone and shaly gray limestone interbedded with gypsum. The formation was deposited in a warm, shallow sea as the shoreline transgressed (invaded) and regressed (retreated) over the land. The average age of the rock is about 273 million years. In modern times it is a ledge- and slope-former that contains fossils of brachiopods, corals, and mollusks along with other animals and various terrestrial plants. The Toroweap is divided into the following three members: Seligman is a slope-forming yellowish to reddish sandstone and siltstone. Brady Canyon is a cliff-forming gray limestone with some chert. Wood Ranch is a slope-forming pale red and gray siltstone and dolomitic sandstone. An unconformity marks the top of this formation.

One of the highest, and therefore youngest, formations seen in the Grand Canyon area is the Kaibab Limestone (see 6d in figure 1). The formation is typically made of sandy limestone sitting on top of a layer of sandstone. This is the cream to grayish-white rock that park visitors stand on while viewing the canyon from both rims. It is also the surface rock covering much of the Kaibab Plateau just north of the canyon and the Coconino Plateau immediately south. Shark teeth have been found in this formation as well as abundant fossils of marine invertebrates such as brachiopods, corals, mollusks, sea lilies, and worms. An unconformity marks the top of this formation.

Mesozoic deposition 

Uplift marked the start of the Mesozoic and streams started to incise the newly dry land. Streams flowing through broad low valleys in Triassic time deposited sediment eroded from nearby uplands, creating the once -thick Moenkopi Formation. The formation is made from sandstone and shale with gypsum layers in between. Moenkopi outcrops are found along the Colorado River in Marble Canyon, on Cedar Mountain (a mesa near the southeastern park border), and in Red Butte (located south of Grand Canyon Village). Remnants of the Shinarump Conglomerate, itself a member of the Chinle Formation, are above the Moenkopi Formation near the top of Red Butte but below a much younger lava flow.

The geology of the Zion and Kolob canyons area and the geology of the Bryce Canyon area records some of these formations. All these rock units together form a super sequence of rock known as the Grand Staircase.

Cenozoic regional uplift and erosion of the canyon

Uplift and nearby extension 

The Laramide orogeny affected all of western North America by helping to build the American cordillera. The Kaibab Uplift, Monument Upwarp, the Uinta Mountains, San Rafael Swell, and the Rocky Mountains were uplifted, at least in part, by the Laramide orogeny. This major mountain-building event started near the end of the Mesozoic, around 75 million years ago, and continued into the Eocene period of the Cenozoic. It was caused by subduction off the western coast of North America. Major faults that trend north–south and cross the canyon area were reactivated by this uplift. Many of these faults are Precambrian in age and are still active today. Streams draining the Rocky Mountains in early Miocene time terminated in landlocked basins in Utah, Arizona and Nevada but there is no evidence for a major river.

Around 18 million years ago, tensional forces started to thin and drop the region to the west, creating the Basin and Range Province. Basins (grabens) dropped down and mountain ranges (horsts) rose up between old and new north–south–trending faults. The extreme western part of the canyon ends at one of the Basin and Range faults, the Grand Wash, which also marks the boundary between the two provinces.

Uplift from the Laramide orogeny and the creation of the Basin and Range province worked together to steepen the gradient of streams flowing west on the Colorado Plateau. These streams cut deep, eastward-growing, channels into the western edge of the Colorado Plateau and deposited their sediment in the widening Basin and Range region.

According to a 2012 study, there is evidence that the western Grand Canyon could be as old as 70 million years.

Colorado River: origin and development 
Rifting started to create the Gulf of California far to the south 6 to 10 million years ago. Around the same time, the western edge of the Colorado Plateau may have sagged slightly. Both events changed the direction of many streams toward the sagging region and the increased gradient caused them to downcut much faster. From 5.5 million to 5 million years ago, headward erosion to the north and east consolidated these streams into one major river and associated tributary channels. This river, the ancestral Lower Colorado River, started to fill the northern arm of the gulf, which extended nearly to the site of Hoover Dam, with estuary deposits.

At the same time, streams flowed from highlands in central Arizona north and across what is today the western Grand Canyon, possibly feeding a larger river. The mechanism by which the ancestral Lower Colorado River captured this drainage and the drainage from much of the rest of the Colorado Plateau is not known. Possible explanations include headward erosion or a broken natural dam of a lake or river. Whatever the cause, the Lower Colorado probably captured the landlocked Upper Colorado somewhere west of the Kaibab Uplift. The much larger drainage area and yet steeper stream gradient helped to further accelerate downcutting.

Ice ages during the Pleistocene brought a cooler and wetter pluvial climate to the region starting 2 to 3 million years ago. The added precipitation increased runoff and the erosive ability of streams (especially from spring melt water and flash floods in summer). With a greatly increased flow volume the Colorado cut faster than ever before and started to quickly excavate the Grand Canyon 2 million years before present, almost reaching the modern depth by 1.2 million years ago.

In that distance, the Colorado River drops  and has excavated an estimated  of sediment to form the canyon. This part of the river bisects the -high Kaibab Uplift and passes seven plateaus (the Kaibab, Kanab, and Shivwits plateaus bound the northern part of the canyon and the Coconino bounds the southern part). Each of these plateaus are bounded by north–south-trending faults and monoclines created or reactivated during the Laramide orogeny. Streams flowing into the Colorado River have since exploited these faults to excavate their own tributary canyons, such as Bright Angel Canyon.

Volcanic activity in the western canyon 

Volcanic activity started in Uinkaret volcanic field (in the western Grand Canyon) about 3 million years ago. Over 150 flows of basaltic lava dammed the Colorado River at least 13 times from 725,000 to 100,000 years ago.

The longevity of the dams and their ability to hold Colorado River water in large lakes has been debated. In one hypothesis water from the Colorado River backed up behind the dams in large lakes that extended as far as Moab, Utah. At the same time, sediment filled the lakes behind the dams. Sediment would fill a lake behind a -high dam in 10.33 months, filled a lake behind an -high dam in 345 years, and filled the lake behind the tallest dam in 3000 years. Cascades of water flowed over a dam while waterfalls migrated up-river along it. Most lava dams lasted for around 10,000 to 20,000 years. However others have proposed that the lava dams were much more ephemeral and failed catastrophically before overtopping. In this model dams would fail due to fluid flow through fractures in the dams and around dam abutments, through permeable river deposits and alluvium.

Since the demise of these dams the Colorado River has carved a maximum of about  into the rocks of the Colorado Plateau

Ongoing geology and human impact 

The end of the Pleistocene ice ages and the start of the Holocene began to change the area's climate from a cool, wet pluvial one to dryer semi-arid conditions similar to that of today. With less water to cut, the erosive ability of the Colorado was greatly reduced. Mass wasting processes thus began to become relatively more important than they were before. Steeper cliffs and further widening the Grand Canyon and its tributary canyon system occurred. An average of two debris flows per year reach the Colorado River from tributary canyons to form or expand rapids. This type of mass wasting is the main way the smaller and steeper side canyons transport sediment but it also plays a major role in excavating the larger canyons.

In 1963 Glen Canyon Dam and other dams farther upstream started to regulate the flow of the Colorado River through Grand Canyon.

Controlling river flow by use of dams has diminished the river's ability to scour rocks by substantially reducing the amount of sediment it carries. Dams on the Colorado River have also changed the character of the river water. Once both muddy and warm, the river is now clear and averages a  temperature year-round.

Grand Canyon lies on the southern end of the Intermountain West seismic belt. At least 35 earthquakes larger than 3.0 on the Richter Scale occurred in the Grand Canyon region in the 20th century. Of these, five registered over 5.0 on the Richter Scale and the largest was a 6.2 quake that occurred in January 1906. Major roughly north–south-trending faults that cross the canyon are (from west to east), the Grand Wash, Hurricane and Toroweap. Major northeast-trending fracture systems of normal faults that intersect the canyon include the West Kaibab and Bright Angel while northwest-trending systems include the Grandview—Phantom. Most earthquakes in the region occur in a narrow northwest-trending band between the Mesa Butte and West Kaibab fracture systems. These events are probably the result of eastward-migrating crustal stretching that may eventually move past the Grand Canyon area.

Trail of Time and Yavapai Geology Museum 

The Trail of Time is an outdoor geology exhibit and nature trail on the South Rim of Grand Canyon National Park. Each meter walked on the trail represents one million years of Grand Canyon's geologic history. Bronze markers on the trail mark your location in time. The trail begins at "Today" near the Yavapai Geology Museum, and ends 2 billion years later at Verkamp's Visitor Center. Along the way are samples of the Canyon's rocks, as you would encounter them going from the rim down to the river, and displays explaining the geologic history of the Canyon. The trail opened in late 2010.

The  Yavapai Geology Museum include three-dimensional models, photographs, and exhibits which allow park visitors to see and understand the complicated geologic story of the area. The museum building, the historic Yavapai Observation Station (built 1928), located one mile (1.6 km) east of Market Plaza, features expansive canyon views. A bookstore offers a variety of materials about the area.

See also 
 Geology of the Colorado Plateau
 Grand Staircase, for regional stratigraphy

Notes and timeline

References

Bibliography

External links 

 U.S. National Park Service (Department of the Interior) – Grand Canyon National Park:
 Nature & Science
Geologic Formations
The Grand Age of Rocks: The Numeric Ages for Rocks Exposed within Grand Canyon 
Bright Angel formation photo gallery
 Geologic timeline for the Grand Canyon at PBS.org
 Interactive Hypermedia – Correlation of the canyon's geology to a Bach fugue [Flash]

Geology of Arizona
Grand Canyon

Grand Canyon
Articles which contain graphical timelines
First 100 IUGS Geological Heritage Sites